Ban Ko station is a railway station located in Ban Ko Subdistrict, Mueang Nakhon Ratchasima District, Nakhon Ratchasima Province. It was rebuilt in 2019 as part of the double tracking project between Thanon Chira Junction and Khon Kaen.

References 

Railway stations in Thailand
Nakhon Ratchasima province